The Agropur Dairy Cooperative, usually shortened to Agropur, is headquartered in Saint-Hubert,  Longueuil, Quebec, Canada.

Agropur Cooperative is a North American dairy cooperative founded in 1938. It is a supplier of products for the industrial, retail, and food service sectors. It is also responsible for a number of its own consumer brands and products .

History 
In 1971, the Quebec-based Coopérative Agricole de Granby (renamed Agropur in 1979) obtained the Canadian licence to manufacture and market Yoplait products. In 1993, Agropur's yogurt  manufacturing and marketing operations were combined with those of Agrifoods, a federal cooperative owned by 2,500 dairy producers in Alberta, British Columbia, and Saskatchewan, forming Ultima Foods.

On August 31, 2017, Agropur and Agrifoods announced that they had concluded an agreement pursuant to which Agropur would become the sole owner of Ultima Foods, subject to regulatory  approval.

In December 2020, Agropur announced the sale of its yogurt activities in Canada to Lactalis (based in France).

In 2022, Agropur made a significant $34 million investment in its ice cream and frozen novelties plant novelties in Truro, Nova Scotia, Canada.

Acquisitions 
In January 2017, Agropur acquired the Nova Scotia-based company Scotsburn, expanding its offering of ice cream and novelty products. At the time of the acquisition, Scotsburn had annual sales of more than  $150 million.

Brands
 Natrel
 Agropur Grand Cheddar
 Oka
 Agropur Signature
 Central Dairies
 Allegro
 Dairytown
 Anco
 Québon
 Farmers
 Lucerne
 Schroeder
 Iceberg
 Masters reserve
 Scotsburn (acquired 2017)
 Island Farms
 Northumberland
 Sealtest Dairy
 Monsieur Gustav

References

Agricultural cooperatives in Canada
Dairy products companies of Canada
Companies based in Longueuil
Food and drink companies established in 1938
1938 establishments in Quebec
Agriculture in Quebec